Efgartigimod alfa, sold under the brand name Vyvgart, is a medication used to treat myasthenia gravis. Efgartigimod alfa is a neonatal Fc receptor blocker and is a new class of medication. It is an antibody fragment that binds to the neonatal Fc receptor (FcRn), preventing FcRn from recycling immunoglobulin G (IgG) back into the blood. The medication causes a reduction in overall levels of IgG, including the abnormal acetylcholine receptor (AChR) antibodies that are present in myasthenia gravis.

The most common side effects include respiratory tract infections, headache, and urinary tract infections.

It was approved for medical use in the United States in December 2021, and in the European Union in August 2022. The US Food and Drug Administration considers it to be a first-in-class medication.

Medical uses 
Efgartigimod alfa is indicated for the treatment of generalized myasthenia gravis (gMG) in adults who are anti-acetylcholine receptor (AChR) antibody positive.

History 
The safety and efficacy of efgartigimod alfa were evaluated in a 26-week clinical study of 167 participants with myasthenia gravis who were randomized to receive either efgartigimod alfa or placebo. The study showed that more participants with myasthenia gravis with antibodies responded to treatment during the first cycle of efgartigimod alfa (68%) compared to those who received placebo (30%) on a measure that assesses the impact of myasthenia gravis on daily function. More participants receiving efgartigimod alfa also demonstrated response on a measure of muscle weakness compared to placebo.

Pharmacodynamics 
Efgartigimod alfa as a drug is an antibody fragment that binds to the neonatal Fc receptor. When this binding happens, the IgG recycling process is blocked. The amount of circulating IgG decreases and therefore prevents the acetylcholine receptors from being degraded by the autoantibodies that are responsible for the myasthenia gravis.

Pharmacokinetics 
The drug is mainly metabolized via proteolytic enzymes. The termination half-life of Efgartigimod alfa is 80 to 120 hours.

Side effects 
Side effects of efgartigimod alfa include respiratory tract infections, headache, urinary tract infection, numbness and tingling and muscle pain.

Society and culture

Legal status 
The U.S. Food and Drug Administration (FDA) granted the application for efgartigimod alfa fast track and orphan drug designations. The FDA granted the approval of Vyvgart to Argenx BV.

On 23 June 2022, the Committee for Medicinal Products for Human Use (CHMP) of the European Medicines Agency (EMA) adopted a positive opinion, recommending the granting of a marketing authorization for the medicinal product Vyvgart, intended for the treatment of anti‑acetylcholine receptor (AChR) antibody positive generalized myasthenia gravis. The applicant for this medicinal product is Argenx. Efgartigimod alfa was approved for medical use in the European Union in August 2022.

Names 
Efgartigimod alfa is the international nonproprietary name (INN).

References

Further reading

External links 
 
 

Orphan drugs